The Rainbow March was a parade for lesbian, gay, bisexual, transgender and transsexual people (LGBT) people in Japan.  Established in 1996, the event held in Sapporo, Hokkaido was the longest continuously run parade for LGBT people in the country. It was last held in 2013.

See also

 LGBT rights in Japan
 Homosexuality in Japan
 List of LGBT events

References

External links
 Rainbow Parade homepage - English 

Pride parades
LGBT culture in Japan
Sapporo
Recurring events established in 1996
Festivals in Hokkaido
Parades in Japan
1996 establishments in Japan